Martin Jude Farawell is an American poet and playwright from New Jersey. He is the current director of the Geraldine R. Dodge Poetry Festival.

Early life and career
Farawell was born in Jersey City, New Jersey, United States.  He completed a bachelor's degree at Montclair State University, graduating summa cum laude. He went on to receive a master's degree in New York University's creative writing program. He has taught composition, literature, creative writing and other subjects at the college and graduate level.

The New Jersey State Council on the Arts awarded Farawell a writing fellowship. His work has been nominated for the Pushcart Prize.

Dodge Poetry Festival
Farawell has been a driving force behind the success of the Geraldine R. Dodge Poetry Festival since 1998, contributing greatly to the planning and preparation. In 2009, he was named Director of the Dodge Poetry Program.

Works

Books
Genesis: A Sequence of Poems (New Spirit Press, 1995)
 Odd Boy (Sibling Rivalry Press, October 2019)

Anthologies
Send My Roots Rain: A Companion on the Grief Journey (Paraclete Press, 2019)
The Traveler's Vade Mecum (Red Hen Press, 2016)
Outsiders: Poems About Rebels, Exiles, and Renegades (Milkweed Editions, 1999)
Prayers to Protest (Pudding House Publications, 1997)
Under a Gull's Wing (Down the Shore Publishing, 1996)
Writing Our Way Out of the Dark (Queen of Swords Press, 1996)

Journals
Bitterroot, Hiram Poetry Review, Lips, Maryland Poetry Review, Orion, Paintbrush, Paterson Literary Review, Poetry East, Southern Review, The Cortland Review, The Literary Review, Tiferet

References

External links
 

20th-century American poets
Montclair State University alumni
New York University alumni
Year of birth missing (living people)
Living people
Poets from New Jersey
American male poets
20th-century American dramatists and playwrights
20th-century American male writers